Skalisty Golets is the highest peak in the Kalar Range, Stanovoy Highlands, Russia.

The Skalisty Golets is a ‘’golets’’-type of mountain with a bald peak. Administratively it is located in the Zabaykalsky Krai of the Russian Far East. The Kalar river flows at the base of the mountain in its upper course.

See also
List of mountains and hills of Russia

References

Mountains of Zabaykalsky Krai
Stanovoy Highlands

ceb:Gora Skalistyy Golets (bukid sa Rusya, Zabaykal'skiy Kray)
nl:Skalisty Golets